Beto is a surname, and a nickname for the given names Alberto, Albertino, Adalberto, Berthony, Heriberto, Norberto, Roberto, Humberto, or Benito. It occurs mostly in Portuguese- and Spanish-speaking countries and communities. Notable people with the name include:

Given name or nickname

Arts and entertainment 
 Beto Benites, Peruvian actor
 Beto Carrero (1937–2008), Brazilian theme park owner and entertainer
 Beto Cuevas (born 1967), Chilean singer and artist
 Robert de la Rocha, American artist
 Beto Guedes (born 1951), Brazilian musician, singer and songwriter
 Gilbert Hernandez (born 1957), American cartoonist best known for the Love and Rockets comics
 Beto O'Byrne, American playwright
 Beto (Portuguese singer) (1967–2010), Portuguese singer Albertino João Santos Pereira
 Beto Pérez, Colombian dancer
 Beto Quintanilla, Mexican singer and musician

Politics 
 Beto Mansur (born 1951), Brazilian politician and soybean farmer
 Beto O'Rourke (born 1972), American Democratic politician, candidate for president in 2020, and former US Representative
 Beto Richa (born 1965), governor of the Brazilian state of Paraná 2011–2018

Sports

Football 
 Beto (footballer, born 1973), full name Valberto Amorim dos Santos, Brazilian football defensive midfielder
 Beto (footballer, born 1975), full name Joubert Araújo Martins, Brazilian football midfielder
 Beto (footballer, born May 1976), full name Roberto Luís Gaspar de Deus Severo, Portuguese football defender
 Beto (footballer, born November 1976), full name Gilberto Galdino dos Santos, Brazilian football midfielder
 Beto (footballer, born 1979), full name Roberto Mendes da Silva, Brazilian football 
 Beto (footballer, born 1980), full name Cícero Herbete de Oliveira Melo, Brazilian football striker
 Beto (footballer, born February 1981), full name Luiz Alberto de Sousa, Brazilian football left-back
 Beto (footballer, born October 1981), full name André Roberto Soares da Silva, Brazilian football striker
 Beto (footballer, born 1982), full name António Alberto Bastos Pimparel, Portuguese football goalkeeper 
 Beto (footballer, born 1984), full name Roberto Fronza, Brazilian football centre-back
 Beto (footballer, born 1986), full name Webert da Silva Miguel, Brazilian football midfielder
 Beto (footballer, born 1987), full name Alberto Antônio de Paula, Brazilian football striker
 Beto (footballer, born 1998), full name Norberto Bercique Gomes Betuncal, Portuguese football striker
 Beto Acosta (born 1966), Argentine football striker
 Beto Carranza (born 1972), Argentine football midfielder
 Beto Naveda (born 1972), Argentine football striker
 Beto Acosta (born 1977), Uruguayan football striker
 Beto Gonçalves (born 1980), Indonesian football striker
 Beto Navarro (born 1989), American soccer defender

Other sports 
 Bobby Ávila (1924–2004), Mexican Major League Baseball player
 Roberto Seabra (born 1976), Brazilian water polo player

Other 
 Beto Laudisio (died 2012), Brazilian student who died in Australian police custody
 Beto Ortiz (born 1968), Peruvian journalist, TV personality, and writer
 Carlos Alberto Rentería Mantilla (born 1945), Colombian narcotrafficker and crime boss

Surname 
 George Beto (1916–1991), American criminologist, educator
 Zé Beto (1960–1990), Portuguese footballer
 Mr. Beto in Cruz v. Beto, a 1972 United States Supreme Court case

Spanish-language hypocorisms
Portuguese masculine given names
Spanish masculine given names